Melissococcus is a genus of Gram-positive, catalase-negative, coccus-shaped lactic acid bacteria within the family Enterococcaceae. Melissococcus species were classified as Streptococcus until 1983 when Melissococcus was recognized as a distinct genus. Notable species include M. plutonius, which is a cause of European foulbrood (an infectious disease that primarily affects honeybees).

References

Enterococcaceae